Ravna may refer:

Bosnia and Herzegovina
 Ravna, Jablanica - a city in Jablanica municipality, Herzegovina-Neretva Canton, Federation of Bosnia and Herzegovina
 Ravna (Maglaj) - a city in Maglaj municipality, Zenica-Doboj Canton, Federation of Bosnia and Herzegovina

Bulgaria (written in Cyrillic as Равна)
 Ravna, Montana Province - a village in Chiprovtsi municipality, Montana Province
 Ravna, Sofia Province - a village in Godech municipality, Sofia Province
 Ravna, Varna Province - a village in Provadiya Municipality, Varna Province

 Serbia (written in Cyrillic as Равна)
 Ravna, Knjaževac - a village in Knjaževac municipality, Zaječar District

 Slovenia
 Ravna, Kanal, a village in the Municipality of Kanal, western Slovenia

See also
 Ravina (disambiguation)
 Ravna Gora (disambiguation)
 Ravna planina